Jonathan Rashleigh (7 January 1820 – 12 April 1905) was an English cricketer active in the early 1840s, making four appearances in first-class cricket. Born at Wilsford, Wiltshire, Rashleigh was educated at Harrow School, for whom he played cricket, and at Balliol College, Oxford, matriculating 1839 and graduating 1842 on B.A.

Rashleigh's batting and bowling styles are unknown. He made his debut in first-class cricket in 1841 for Oxford University against the Marylebone Cricket Club (MCC) at the Magdalen Ground, Oxford. He made three further first-class appearances for the university in 1842, playing twice against the MCC and once in The University Match against Oxford University at Lord's. He scored a total of 42 runs with a high score of 20, while with the ball he took two wickets.

He was a Deputy Lieutenant of Cornwall. He died at the Menabilly Estate on 12 April 1905.

References

External links
Jonathan Rashleigh at ESPNcricinfo
Jonathan Rashleigh at CricketArchive

1820 births
1905 deaths
People from Wiltshire
People educated at Harrow School
Alumni of Balliol College, Oxford
English cricketers
Oxford University cricketers
Deputy Lieutenants of Cornwall